The 2022–23 season is the 108th season of the Isthmian League, which is an English football competition featuring semi-professional and amateur clubs from London, East and South East England. The league operates four divisions, the Premier Division at Step 3 and three divisions, North, South Central and South East at Step 4 of the National League System. This was the fifth season since the former South Division was subdivided into the South Central and South East divisions. The league was also known as the Pitching In League under a sponsorship deal with Entain, formerly GVC Holdings.

The allocations for Step 4 this season were announced by The Football Association (FA) on 12 May 2022. Numerous changes were made to the constitutions of the level 8 divisions within the Isthmian League.

Premier Division
The Premier Division comprised 17 clubs from the previous season, as well as 5 clubs who newly joined the Premier Division this season.

Team changes

To the Premier Division
Promoted from the North Division
Aveley
Canvey Island

Promoted from the South East Division
Hastings United
Herne Bay

Relegated from the National League South
Billericay Town

From the Premier Division
Promoted to the National League South
Cheshunt
Worthing

Relegated to the North Division
East Thurrock United

Relegated to the South Central Division
Leatherhead
Merstham

Premier Division Table

Results table

Stadiums and locations

North Division
The North Division comprises 20 teams, 15 of which competed in the previous season.

Team changes

To the North Division
Promoted from the Eastern Counties League
Gorleston
Wroxham

Promoted from the Spartan South Midlands League
New Salamis

Relegated from the Premier Division
East Thurrock United

Relegated from the Southern League
Lowestoft Town

From the North Division
Transferred to the Northern Premier League
Dereham Town

Promoted to the Premier Division
Aveley
Canvey Island

Relegated to the Essex Senior League
Barking
Romford

North Division Table

Results table

Stadiums and locations

South Central Division
The South Central Division comprises 20 teams, up from 19 the previous season. Of the 20, 15 competed in 2021–22.

Team changes

To the South Central Division
Promoted from the Combined Counties League Premier Division North
Hanworth Villa
Southall

Promoted from the Combined Counties League Premier Division South
Walton & Hersham

Relegated from the Premier Division
Leatherhead
Merstham

From the South Central Division
Promoted to the Southern League
Bracknell Town
Hanwell Town

Relegated to the Combined Counties League
Chalfont St Peter
Staines Town

South Central Division table

Results table

Stadiums and locations

South East Division
The South East Division comprises 20 teams, 16 of which competed in the previous season

Team changes

To the South East Division
Promoted from the Combined Counties League
Beckenham Town

Promoted from the Southern Counties East League
Chatham Town
Sheppey United

Promoted from the Southern Combination
Littlehampton Town

From the South East Division
Promoted to the Premier Division
Hastings United
Herne Bay

Relegated to the Southern Counties East League
Phoenix Sports
Whitstable Town

South East Division table

Results table

Stadiums and locations

League Cup
The 2022–23 Velocity Trophy (formerly the Isthmian League Cup) will be the 49th season of the Alan Turvey Trophy, the cup competition of the whole Isthmian League.

Horsham were defending champions, having beaten Margate in the 2021–22 season.

Calendar

First round
Sixteen clubs participated in the first round.

Second round
The eight clubs who made it through the first round were joined in the draw by twenty-four clubs who received a bye to the second round, making thirty-two clubs.

Third round
Sixteen of twenty-two Premier Division sides participated in this season’s competition. These teams received a bye to the third round, and joined the sixteen clubs that advanced past the second round.

Fourth round

Quarter-finals

Semi-finals

See also
 Isthmian League
2022–23 Northern Premier League
2022–23 Southern League

References

External links
Official website

2022–23
7